Aristolochia acuminata, the native Dutchman's pipe or Indian birthwort is a poisonous perennial vine that is endemic to Asia and Malesia, New Guinea and the Solomon Islands and northern Australia.

Description
Aristolochia acuminata is an evergreen vine. The hypanthium flowers are between 10 and 13 mm long. It also has capsuled ellipsoid fruits.

References

Bibliography
 
 

 Lamarck, J.B.A.P de Monnet (1783) Encycl. 1: 254. Type: India, Commerson.Holo: P.

acuminata
Vines
Drought-tolerant plants
Plants described in 1783
Flora of Queensland
Angiosperms of Western Australia